The 1928 Rutgers Queensmen football team represented Rutgers University as an independent during the 1928 college football season. In their second season under head coach Harry Rockafeller, the Queensmen compiled a 6–3 record and were outscored by their opponents, 116 to 97. The captain was Stan Rosen.

Schedule

References

Rutgers
Rutgers Scarlet Knights football seasons
Rutgers Queensmen football